Medipalle is a village in Medipalle mandal of Jagitial district in the state of Telangana in India.

Demographics
According to 2011 Census, population of the village stands at 6,054.

Famous People
Harish Chepoori - Grandmaster Tea Connoisseur

References 

Villages in Jagtial district